Ben Jorgensen is an American musician, singer, songwriter and guitarist. He is best-known as the lead singer and the guitarist of the rock band Armor for Sleep.

Early life and education
Jorgensen grew up in Teaneck, New Jersey, and is of German, Danish, and Japanese descent. Jorgensen attended the Jewish day school, Solomon Schechter Day School of Bergen County, and the Solomon Schechter of Essex and Union, where he graduated in 2001.

Musical career

Early in his musical career Jorgensen was the drummer for punk band Random Task. Jorgensen then formed Armor for Sleep in 2001. He began writing the first songs during the summer after his first year in college. Jorgensen recorded these songs as a demo CD for $100 at a local recording studio, with Jorgensen playing all the instruments himself. These songs were later re-recorded for Armor For Sleep's debut album, Dream to Make Believe, released in 2003 on Equal Vision Records.

Armor for Sleep disbanded in 2009 (though they would later reunite in 2020), and Jorgensen started an electronic project with Sierra Shardae, named God Loves a Challenge, which only released an unnamed EP of various tracks. Jorgensen recorded his debut solo EP, titled There Is Nowhere Left to Go, at Treehouse Studios in Jersey City, and was released on October 5, 2010 via digital download.

Jorgensen made a cameo appearance in Fall Out Boy's "Dance, Dance" video in 2005, and also in Cobra Starship's video for "The City Is at War," in 2007, playing alongside Pete Wentz as a policeman.

Personal life
In 2013, Jorgensen married actress Katrina Bowden.

They divorced in 2020. He is now dating Kailey Cost.

Discography
Armor for Sleep
Dream to Make Believe (2003)
What to Do When You Are Dead (2005)
Smile For Them (2007)
The Way Out Is Broken EP (2008)
The Rain Museum (2022)

God Loves A Challenge
Various tracks (2009) self-released

Solo material
There Is Nowhere Left To Go EP (October 5, 2010) self-released

Singles

Armor for Sleep

References

External links

Armor For Sleep's official website
Armor For Sleep on the Equal Vision Records site

Living people
American male singers
American rock singers
American rock guitarists
American male guitarists
Golda Och Academy alumni
Singers from New Jersey
People from Teaneck, New Jersey
American people of Danish descent
American people of German descent
American musicians of Japanese descent
Guitarists from New Jersey
Year of birth missing (living people)